Constantijn Jonker (born 20 September 1987) is a former field hockey player from the Netherlands, who played as a forward.

Personal life
Constantijn Jonker was born and raised in Utrecht, Netherlands.

Career

Club hockey
At a domestic level, Jonker plays for his home club, SV Kampong in the Dutch Hoofdklasse.

International hockey
Constantijn Jonker made his debut for the Netherlands in 2006, at just nineteen years of age.

Following his debut, Jonker's appearances in the national team were quite sporadic, until he became a mainstay in the squad from 2013.

Jonker medalled with the national team on five occasions throughout his career. He won three medals at the EuroHockey Championships, gold in 2015, as well as bronze in 2009 and 2013. He also won silver at the 2014 FIH World Cup as well as gold at the 2012–13 FIH World League.

Jonker retired from international hockey in 2016 after he failed to make the Rio Olympic team.

References

External links
 

1987 births
Living people
Male field hockey forwards
Dutch male field hockey players
2014 Men's Hockey World Cup players
SV Kampong players
Men's Hoofdklasse Hockey players
20th-century Dutch people
21st-century Dutch people